Declan Kelly is an Australian media executive. Kelly is General Manager of radio stations 6PR and 96fm. He is also a member of the Perth Glory FC Advisory Board.

Kelly won an Australian Commercial Radio Award for most popular Metropolitan Radio Manager in 2004.

He was General Manager of both 96FM & 6PR from 2000 to 2010.

He set up his own Radio consultancy DEK Media in 2011 and consulted various Radio Station around Europe.

In May 2017 he joined TAB Radio to look after all commercial activities. TAB Radio broadcasts in Perth on 1206am and right around Western Australia via 34 various frequencies.

In March 2019 he joined SEN Sports Network looking after Sales/Sponsorships and is co-host of The TAB Touch Lounge Breakfast show on SEN 657am.

In December 2020 he left SEN to fully concentrate on growing DEK Media's interests in various Radio Networks.

References 

Living people
Association football executives
Australian radio executives
Year of birth missing (living people)